The 2017–18 Sacramento Kings season was the 73rd season of the franchise, its 69th season in the National Basketball Association (NBA), and its 33rd in Sacramento.

With the Minnesota Timberwolves clinching their first winning record and playoff berth since 2003–04, the Kings now hold the current league record of most seasons without a winning record as well as the longest postseason drought, both at 12, with their last winning season and playoff appearance being a 44–38 record and a First Round defeat to the San Antonio Spurs in six games in the 2005–06 season. The Kings have now equalled  the Golden State Warriors between 1994–95 and 2005–06 as the third-longest NBA postseason drought on record, behind only the Timberwolves above and the fifteen-season drought by the Buffalo Braves, San Diego Clippers and Los Angeles Clippers between 1976–77 and 1990–91 inclusive. The Kings now need three more losing seasons to break the NBA record for most consecutive losing seasons, which the Kings set between 1983–84 and 1997–98 and had been previously suffered by the Pistons between 1956–57 and 1969–70 inclusive.

Draft picks

Each of the Sacramento Kings' picks they acquired this year would be had via trades. The fifth pick of the draft, which was originally placed to be a likely 8th pick, had them move up into the Top 3 before the Philadelphia 76ers activated their pick swapping rights with them moving down from a likely fourth spot to the fifth pick due to the trade where they gave up Nik Stauskas, Carl Landry, Jason Thompson, their unprotected 2019 first round pick, and the rights for Philadelphia to swap first round picks in 2017 in exchange for the rights of Artūras Gudaitis and Luka Mitrović. Meanwhile, both their second Top 10 first round pick (at pick 10) and their sole second round pick came from the New Orleans Pelicans, where they gave up their star center DeMarcus Cousins and Omri Casspi in order to acquire both the Pelicans' first round pick and the second round pick that the Philadelphia 76ers held this year, as well as gain the return of Tyreke Evans, last year's All-Rookie team member Buddy Hield, and Langston Galloway. As for their own second round selection (which was worst then the second round pick they got from the 76ers via the Pelicans), they originally traded it away to the Cleveland Cavaliers back when it originally considered a first round pick alongside the aforementioned Omri Casspi for JJ Hickson before Cleveland traded it out to the Chicago Bulls alongside Andrew Bynum, the rights to swap first round picks with the Cavaliers, and multiple second round picks from the Portland Trail Blazers for Luol Deng.

With Sacramento's first pick (acquired from Philadelphia), they selected De'Aaron Fox, a freshman point guard from the University of Kentucky. Under his only season with Kentucky, De'Aaron averaged 16.7 points, 4.6 assists, 3.9 rebounds, and 1.5 steals per game in 36 games played (34 started) while also earning the Southeastern Conference's Tournament MVP, the All-SEC Freshman Team honors, and All-SEC First Team honors there. As for their first round pick that was acquired from Philadelphia, they traded that selection (who became freshman center Zach Collins from Gonzaga University) to the Portland Trail Blazers in exchange for their first two first round picks this year. With Portland's first pick, they selected Justin Jackson, a junior small forward/shooting guard from the recent champion North Carolina University. During his time there, he would help the Tar Heels out in their quest for a redemption championship by averaging 18.3 points, 4.6 rebounds, and 2.8 assists per game out in North Carolina. He would also earn the ACC's Player of The Year Award that year, as well as be named a consensus All-American First Team member and All-ACC First Team member, as well as previously be named a member of the All-ACC Freshman Team of 2015. As for their second and final selection that was previously held under Portland's name, the Kings would select another former #1 draft prospect late in the first round, this time being freshman power forward Harry Giles from Duke University. Similar to Skal Labissière before him, Giles was also a former #1 draft prospect. However, a torn ACL his senior year of high school and other knee issues resulted in what would be considered a disappointing freshman year at Duke, averaging 3.9 points and rebounds per game (as well as 0.7 blocks and 0.4 assists and steals) in 26 games (6 of which he started in) there before declaring early. Finally, with their sole second round pick (acquired from Philadelphia via New Orleans), Sacramento would select Frank Mason III, a senior point guard from the University of Kansas. As the consensus college basketball player of the year, Frank would average 20.9 points, 5.2 assists, 4.2 rebounds, and 1.3 steals per game in 36 games played that year for Kansas as he (alongside Josh Jackson) would help the Jayhawks compete for the NCAA Tournament that year before unfortunately losing out to Oregon University at the Elite Eight.

Roster

<noinclude>

Standings

Division

Conference

Game log

Preseason

|- style="background:#bfb;"
| 1
| October 2
| San Antonio
| 
| Frank Mason III (17)
| Frank Mason III (6)
| George Hill (5)
| Golden 1 Center16,000
| 1–0
|- style="background:#fcc;"
| 2
| October 6
| @ San Antonio
| 
| Willie Cauley-Stein (14)
| Willie Cauley-Stein (9)
| De'Aaron Fox (6)
| AT&T Center18,082
| 1–1
|- style="background:#fcc;"
| 3
| October 8
| @ LA Lakers
| 
| Zach Randolph (16)
| George Hill (8)
| Bogdanovic, Hill, Randolph (3)
| T-Mobile Arena13,094
| 1–2
|- style="background:#fcc;"
| 4
| October 9
| Portland
| 
| Justin Jackson (16)
| Willie Cauley-Stein (8)
| Marcus Williams (5)
| Golden 1 CenterN/A
| 1–3
|- style="background:#fcc;"
| 5
| October 12
| @ L.A. Clippers
| 
| Zach Randolph (14)
| Kosta Koufos (10)
| Frank Mason III (4)
| Staples Center11,225
| 1–4
|- style="background:#fcc;"
| 6
| October 13
| @ Golden State
| 
| David Stockton (23)
| Skal Labissiere (8)
| David Stockton (8)
| Oracle Arena19,596
| 1–5

Regular season

|- style="background:#fbb"
| 1
| October 18
| Houston
| 
| Willie Cauley-Stein (21)
| Cauley-Stein, Labissiere (10)
| De'Aaron Fox (5)
| Golden 1 Center17,583
| 0–1
|- style="background:#bfb"
| 2
| October 20
| @ Dallas
| 
| George Hill (21)
| Willie Cauley-Stein (11)
| De'Aaron Fox (10)
| American Airlines Center19,273
| 1–1
|- style="background:#fbb"
| 3
| October 21
| @ Denver
| 
| De'Aaron Fox (18)
| Zach Randolph (9)
| Skal Labissiere (4)
| Pepsi Center19,520
| 1–2
|- style="background:#fbb"
| 4
| October 23
| @ Phoenix
| 
| Garrett Temple (23)
| Kosta Koufos (9)
| Fox, Hill, Cauley-Stein (4)
| Talking Stick Resort Arena14,903
| 1–3
|- style="background:#fbb"
| 5
| October 26
| New Orleans
| 
| De'Aaron Fox (14)
| Zach Randolph (9)
| Fox, Hill (5)
| Golden 1 Center17,583
| 1–4
|- style="background:#fbb"
| 6
| October 29
| Washington
| 
| Frank Mason III (11)
| Willie Cauley-Stein (9)
| De'Aaron Fox (5)
| Golden 1 Center17,583
| 1–5
|- style="background:#fbb"
| 7
| October 31
| @ Indiana
| 
| De'Aaron Fox (18)
| Skal Labissiere (8)
| De'Aaron Fox (5)
| Bankers Life Fieldhouse12,245
| 1–6

|- style="background:#fbb"
| 8
| November 1
| @ Boston
| 
| Zach Randolph (16)
| Buddy Hield (7)
| De'Aaron Fox (6)
| TD Garden18,624
| 1–7
|- style="background:#fbb"
| 9
| November 4
| @ Detroit
| 
| Zach Randolph (19)
| Buddy Hield (8)
| Frank Mason III (6)
| Little Caesars Arena17,683
| 1–8
|- style="background:#bfb;"
| 10
| November 7
|Oklahoma City
| 
| Buddy Hield (21)
| Zach Randolph (8)
| De'Aaron Fox (8)
| Golden 1 Center17,583
| 2–8
|- style="background:#bfb;"
| 11
| November 9
| Philadelphia
| 
| Zach Randolph (20)
| Kosta Koufos (12)
| Fox, Hill (7)
| Golden 1 Center17,583
| 3–8
|- style="background:#fbb"
| 12
| November 11
| @ New York
| 
| Buddy Hield (17)
| Kosta Koufos (10)
| Buddy Hield (4)
| Madison Square Garden19,812
| 3–9
|- style="background:#fbb"
| 13
| November 13
| @ Washington
| 
| George Hill (16)
| Zach Randolph (8)
| De'Aaron Fox (5)
| Capital One Arena14,660
| 3–10
|- style="background:#fbb"
| 14
| November 15
| @ Atlanta
| 
| Zach Randolph (16)
| Jackson, Koufos, Randolph (4)
| Cauley-Stein, Temple (3)
| Philips Arena13,860
| 3–11
|- style="background:#bfb"
| 15
| November 17
| Portland
| 
| Willie Cauley-Stein (22)
| Willie Cauley-Stein (10)
| De'Aaron Fox (4)
| Golden 1 Center17,583
| 4–11
|- style="background:#fbb"
| 16
| November 18
| @ Portland
| 
| Willie Cauley-Stein (18)
| Willie Cauley-Stein (9)
| Bogdan Bogdanovic (3)
| Moda Center19,522
| 4–12
|- style="background:#fbb"
| 17
| November 20
| Denver
| 
| Hill, Koufos (16)
| Zach Randolph (6)
| De'Aaron Fox (5)
| Golden 1 Center17,583
| 4–13
|- style="background:#bfb"
| 18
| November 22
| LA Lakers
| 
| Willie Cauley-Stein (26)
| Skal Labissiere (8)
| Bogdanovic, Mason III, Randolph (7)
| Golden 1 Center17,583
| 5–13
|- style="background:#fbb;"
| 19
| November 25
| LA Clippers
| 
| Buddy Hield (27)
| Zach Randolph (7)
| Fox, Hill, Randolph, Cauley-Stein (3)
| Golden 1 Center17,583
| 5–14
|- style="background:#bfb;"
| 20
| November 27
| @ Golden State
| 
| Willie Cauley-Stein (19)
| Willie Cauley-Stein (8)
| Willie Cauley-Stein (6)
| Oracle Arena19,596
| 6–14
|- style="background:#fbb;"
| 21
| November 28
| Milwaukee
| 
| Garrett Temple (18)
| Willie Cauley-Stein (10)
| Frank Mason (7)
| Golden 1 Center17,583
| 6–15

|- style="background:#bfb;"
| 22
| December 1
| @ Chicago
| 
| Zach Randolph (25)
| Zach Randolph (13)
| Willie Cauley-Stein (5)
| United Center19,268
| 7–15
|- style="background:#fbb;"
| 23
| December 2
| @ Milwaukee
| 
| Zach Randolph (22)
| Zach Randolph (7)
| Buddy Hield (4)
| Bradley Center15,581
| 7–16
|- style="background:#fbb;"
| 24
| December 6
| @ Cleveland
| 
| Zach Randolph (18)
| JaKarr Sampson (16)
| Zach Randolph (6)
| Quicken Loans Arena20,562
| 7–17
|- style="background:#bfb;"
| 25
| December 8
| @ New Orleans
| 
| Zach Randolph (35)
| Zach Randolph (13)
| De'Aaron Fox (4)
| Smoothie King Center15,019
| 8–17
|- style="background:#fbb;"
| 26
| December 10
| Toronto
| 
| Zach Randolph (19)
| Zach Randolph (11)
| Jackson, Mason III (3)
| Golden 1 Center17,583
| 8–18
|- style="background:#bfb;"
| 27
| December 12
| Phoenix
| 
| George Hill (18)
| Kosta Koufos (8)
| Zach Randolph (5)
| Golden 1 Center17,583
| 9–18
|- style="background:#fbb;"
| 28
| December 14
| @ Minnesota
| 
| George Hill (16)
| Zach Randolph (9)
| Frank Mason (4)
| Target Center11,126
| 9–19
|- style="background:#fbb;"
| 29
| December 17
| @ Toronto
| 
| Bogdanovic, Temple (18)
| Koufos, Cauley-Stein (6)
| Bogdanovic, Hill (5)
| Air Canada Centre19,800
| 9–20
|- style="background:#bfb;"
| 30
| December 19
| @ Philadelphia
| 
| Zach Randolph (27)
| Garrett Temple (8)
| Garrett Temple (4)
| Wells Fargo Center20,558
| 10–20
|- style="background:#bfb;"
| 31
| December 20
| @ Brooklyn
| 
| George Hill (22)
| Willie Cauley-Stein (9)
| George Hill (4)
| Barclays Center13,179
| 11–20
|- style="background:#fbb;"
| 32
| December 23
| San Antonio
| 
| Buddy Hield (24)
| Willie Cauley-Stein (11)
| George Hill (6)
| Golden 1 Center17,583
| 11–21
|- style="background:#fbb;"
| 33
| December 26
| @ LA Clippers
| 
| Willie Cauley-Stein (17)
| Willie Cauley-Stein (7)
| George Hill (5)
| Staples Center16,393
| 11–22
|- style="background:#bfb;"
| 34
| December 27
| Cleveland
| 
| Vince Carter (24)
| Willie Cauley-Stein (9)
| Bogdan Bogdanovic (8)
| Golden 1 Center17,583
| 12–22
|- style="background:#fbb;"
| 35
| December 29
| Phoenix
| 
| Zach Randolph (14)
| Willie Cauley-Stein (9)
| Mason, Temple (5)
| Golden 1 Center17,583
| 12–23
|- style="background:#fbb;"
| 36
| December 31
| Memphis
| 
| Willie Cauley-Stein (21)
| Willie Cauley-Stein (8)
| Bogdan Bogdanovic (5)
| Golden 1 Center17,583
| 12–24

|- style="background:#fbb;"
| 37
| January 2
| Charlotte
| 
| Zach Randolph (24)
| Skal Labissiere (15)
| Bogdan Bogdanovic (5)
| Golden 1 Center17,583
| 12–25
|- style="background:#bfb;"
| 38
| January 6
| Denver
| 
| De'Aaron Fox (18)
| Vince Carter (8)
| De'Aaron Fox (7)
| Golden 1 Center17,583
| 13–25
|- style="background:#fbb;"
| 39
| January 8
| San Antonio
| 
| Willie Cauley-Stein (22)
| Willie Cauley-Stein (9)
| De'Aaron Fox (10)
| Golden 1 Center17,583
| 13–26
|- style="background:#fbb;"
| 40
| January 9
| @ LA Lakers
| 
| Bogdan Bogdanovic (19)
| Kosta Koufos (15)
| Bogdan Bogdanovic (4)
| Staples Center18,997
| 13–27
|- style="background:#fbb;"
| 41
| January 11
| LA Clippers
| 
| Bogdan Bogdanovic (22)
| Kosta Koufos (14)
| De'Aaron Fox (6)
| Golden 1 Center17,583
| 13–28
|- style="background:#fbb;"
| 42
| January 13
| @ LA Clippers
| 
| Willie Cauley-Stein (23)
| Willie Cauley-Stein (13)
| De'Aaron Fox (10)
| Staples Center16,656
| 13–29
|- style="background:#fbb;"
| 43
| January 15
| @ Oklahoma City
| 
| Buddy Hield (16)
| Labissiere, Cauley-Stein (7)
| De'Aaron Fox (5)
| Chesapeake Energy Arena18,203
| 13–30
|- style="background:#fbb;"
| 44
| January 17
| Utah
| 
| Willie Cauley-Stein (26)
| Willie Cauley-Stein (10)
| George Hill (5)
| Golden 1 Center17,583
| 13–31
|- style="background:#fbb;"
| 45
| January 19
| @ Memphis
| 
| De'Aaron Fox (16)
| Willie Cauley-Stein (11)
| De'Aaron Fox (6)
| FedExForum16,831
| 13–32
|- style="background:#fbb;"
| 46
| January 22
| @ Charlotte
| 
| Skal Labissiere (23)
| Willie Cauley-Stein (10)
| Bogdanovic, Fox (7)
| Spectrum Center11,806
| 13–33
|- style="background:#bfb;"
| 47
| January 23
| @ Orlando
| 
| Garrett Temple (34)
| Labissiere, Cauley-Stein (9)
| Vince Carter (6)
| Amway Center18,846
| 14–33
|- style="background:#bfb;"
| 48
| January 25
| @ Miami
| 
| Buddy Hield (24)
| Zach Randolph (10)
| De'Aaron Fox (4)
| American Airlines Arena19,600
| 15–33
|- style="background:#fbb;"
| 49
| January 28
| @ San Antonio
| 
| De'Aaron Fox (26)
| Kosta Koufos (12)
| Zach Randolph (6)
| AT&T Center18,418
| 15–34
|- style="background:#bfb;"
| 50
| January 30
| @ New Orleans
| 
| Zach Randolph (26)
| Kosta Koufos (17)
| Garrett Temple (6)
| Smoothie King Center14,292
| 16–34

|- style="background:#fbb;"
| 51
| February 2
| Golden State
| 
| Zach Randolph (18)
| Zach Randolph (7)
| Bogdanovic, Fox (6)
| Golden 1 Center16,583
| 16–35
|- style="background:#fbb;"
| 52
| February 3
| Dallas
| 
| De'Aaron Fox (15)
| Willie Cauley-Stein (8)
| Bogdan Bogdanovic (6)
| Golden 1 Center17,583
| 16–36
|- style="background:#bfb;"
| 53
| February 5
| Chicago
| 
| Bogdan Bogdanovic (15)
| Zach Randolph (9)
| George Hill (5)
| Golden 1 Center17,583
| 17–36
|- style="background:#fbb;"
| 54
| February 9
| Portland
| 
| Willie Cauley-Stein (19)
| Zach Randolph (9)
| De'Aaron Fox (9)
| Golden 1 Center17,583
| 17–37
|- style="background:#fbb;"
| 55
| February 11
| @ Minnesota
| 
| De'Aaron Fox (23)
| Kosta Koufos (10)
| Bogdan Bogdanovic (8)
| Target Center18,068
| 17–38
|- style="background:#bfb;"
| 56
| February 13
| @ Dallas
| 
| Zach Randolph (22)
| Koufos, Randolph (7)
| Carter, Fox (7)
| American Airlines Center19,801
| 18–38
|- style="background:#fbb;"
| 57
| February 14
| @ Houston
| 
| Bogdan Bogdanovic (20)
| Koufos, Cauley-Stein (8)
| Bogdanovic, Cauley-Stein (5)
| Toyota Center18,055
| 18–39
|- style="background:#fbb;"
| 58
| February 22
| Oklahoma City
| 
| Zach Randolph (29)
| Zach Randolph (12)
| Garrett Temple (5)
| Golden 1 Center17,583
| 18–40
|- style="background:#fbb;"
| 59
| February 24
| LA Lakers
| 
| Bogdanovic, Hield (21)
| Willie Cauley-Stein (13)
| Fox, Mason III (6)
| Golden 1 Center17,583
| 18–41
|- style="background:#fbb;"
| 60
| February 26
| Minnesota
| 
| Skal Labissiere (20)
| Hield, Cauley-Stein (5)
| Bogdan Bogdanovic (6)
| Golden 1 Center17,583
| 18–42
|- style="background:#fbb;"
| 61
| February 27
| @ Portland
| 
| Zach Randolph (20)
| Willie Cauley-Stein (10)
| De'Aaron Fox (8)
| Moda Center19,468
| 18–43

|- style="background:#bfb;"
| 62
| March 1
| Brooklyn
| 
| Bogdan Bogdanovic (23)
| Kosta Koufos (11)
| Willie Cauley-Stein (6)
| Golden 1 Center17,583
| 19–43
|- style="background:#fbb;"
| 63
| March 3
| Utah
| 
| De'Aaron Fox (17)
| Skal Labissiere (12)
| Fox, Jackson, Koufos, Labissiere (3)
| Golden 1 Center17,583
| 19–44
|- style="background:#bfb;"
| 64
| March 4
| NY Knicks
| 
| Bogdan Bogdanovic (22)
| Kosta Koufos (8)
| Bogdan Bogdanovic (7)
| Golden 1 Center17,583
| 20–44
|- style="background:#fbb;"
| 65
| March 7
| New Orleans
| 
| Buddy Hield (20)
| Kosta Koufos (10)
| Frank Mason III (6)
| Golden 1 Center17,583
| 20–45
|- style="background:#bfb;"
| 66
| March 9
| Orlando
| 
| Garrett Temple (23)
| Kosta Koufos (13)
| Bogdan Bogdanovic (10)
| Golden 1 Center17,583
| 21–45
|- style="background:#fbb;"
| 67
| March 11
| @ Denver
| 
| Buddy Hield (18)
| Kosta Koufos (10)
| De'Aaron Fox (9)
| Pepsi Center19,520
| 21–46
|- style="background:#fbb;"
| 68
| March 12
| @ Oklahoma City
| 
| Bogdan Bogdanovic (19)
| Kosta Koufos (10)
| De'Aaron Fox (10)
| Chesapeake Energy Arena18,203
| 21–47
|- style="background:#bfb;"
| 69
| March 14
| Miami
| 
| Buddy Hield (24)
| Zach Randolph (9)
| Zach Randolph (4)
| Golden 1 Center17,583
| 22–47
|- style="background:#bfb;"
| 70
| March 16
| @ Golden State
| 
| Buddy Hield (22)
| Kosta Koufos (12)
| Buddy Hield (7)
| Oracle Arena19,596
| 23–47
|- style="background:#fbb;"
| 71
| March 17
| @ Utah
| 
| Buddy Hield (23)
| Hield, Koufos, Mason III (6)
| Buddy Hield (6)
| Vivint Smart Home Arena18,306
| 23–48
|- style="background:#fbb;"
| 72
| March 19
| Detroit
| 
| Buddy Hield (20)
| Hield, Cauley-Stein (6)
| Willie Cauley-Stein (5)
| Golden 1 Center17,583
| 23–49
|- style="background:#bfb;"
| 73
| March 22
| Atlanta
| 
| Justin Jackson (20)
| Kosta Koufos (11)
| Frank Mason III (8)
| Golden 1 Center17,583
| 24–49
|- style="background:#fbb;"
| 74
| March 25
| Boston
| 
| Buddy Hield (21)
| Kosta Koufos (9)
| Mason III, Cauley-Stein (4)
| Golden 1 Center17,583
| 24–50
|- style="background:#fbb;"
| 75
| March 27
| Dallas
| 
| Skal Labissiere (19)
| Jackson, Labissiere (8)
| De'Aaron Fox (6)
| Golden 1 Center17,583
| 24–51
|- style="background:#fbb;"
| 76
| March 29
| Indiana
| 
| Bogdan Bogdanovic (21)
| Hield, Cauley-Stein (7)
| Fox, Cauley-Stein (5)
| Golden 1 Center17,583
| 24–52
|- style="background:#fbb;"
| 77
| March 31
| Golden State
| 
| Buddy Hield (19)
| Willie Cauley-Stein (8)
| De'Aaron Fox (8)
| Golden 1 Center17,583
| 24–53

|- style="background:#bfb;"
| 78
| April 1
| @ LA Lakers
| 
| Buddy Hield (19)
| Skal Labissiere (9)
| De'Aaron Fox (6)
| Staples Center18,997
| 25–53
|- style="background:#fbb;"
| 79
| April 3
| @ Phoenix
| 
| Bogdan Bogdanovic (22)
| De'Aaron Fox (9)
| De'Aaron Fox (5)
| Talking Stick Resort Arena16,826
| 25–54
|- style="background:#bfb;"
| 80
| April 6
| @ Memphis
| 
| Willie Cauley-Stein (18)
| Willie Cauley-Stein (8)
| Buddy Hield (6)
| FedExForum16,527
| 26–54
|- style="background:#fbb;"
| 81
| April 9
| @ San Antonio
| 
| Willie Cauley-Stein (25)
| Willie Cauley-Stein (10)
| De'Aaron Fox (7)
| AT&T Center18,418
| 26–55
|- style="background:#bfb;"
| 82
| April 11
| Houston
| 
| Willie Cauley-Stein (22)
| Willie Cauley-Stein (11)
| Bogdanovic, Hield (5)
| Golden 1 Center17,583
| 27–55

Transactions

Trades

Free agency

Additions

Subtractions

Awards

References

Sacramento Kings seasons
Sacramento Kings
Sacramento Kings
Sacramento Kings